This list of freight ship companies is arranged by country. Companies listed own and/or operate bulk carriers, car carriers, container ships, Roll-on/roll-off (for freight), and tankers.
For a list of companies that own and operate passenger ships (cruise ships, cargo-passenger ships, and ferries), see List of passenger ship companies.

Key
" " - Call sign or common name, - Parent company or conglomerate, > - Previous company name, >> - Company name in local language

BC - Bulk carriers, CC - Car carriers, CS - Container ships, RR - Roll-on/Roll-off (for freight), TK - Tankers

Africa

Ethiopia 
 Ethiopian Shipping Lines

South Africa
 Safmarine (A. P. Moller-Maersk Group, Denmark)

Asia

Azerbaijan
 Azerbaijan Caspian Shipping Company

Bangladesh
 Bangladesh Shipping Corporation (State-owned enterprise)

China
 China COSCO Shipping "COSCO" (State-owned enterprise)
 Sinotrans (HK) Shipping "Sinotrans" (State-owned enterprise)

Hong Kong
 Anglo-Eastern Group
 Fleet Management Limited
 The China Navigation Company (Swire Group, UK)
 Jinhui Shipping and Transport (Jinhui Holdings)
 Orient Overseas Container Line "OOCL"
 Pacific Basin Shipping Limited

India
 Mercator Limited
 Shipping Corporation of India (State-owned enterprise)
 Dredging Corporation of India (State-owned enterprise)

Indonesia
 Bumi Laut Group

Iran
 Islamic Republic of Iran Shipping Lines "IRISL" (IRISL Group)

Israel
 Zim Integrated Shipping Services (Ofer Brothers Group)

Japan
 Kawasaki Kisen Kaisha "K Line" - BC, CC, RR, TK
 Mitsui O.S.K. Lines "MOL" (Mitsui Group) - BC, CC, RR, TK
 Nippon Yusen Kaisha "NYK Line" (Mitsubishi Group) - BC, CC, RR, TK
 Ocean Network Express "ONE" (K Line, MOL, and NYK Line) - CS
 Toyofuji Shipping
 Nissan Motor Car Carrier

Singapore
 BW Offshore
 Hong Lam Marine
 Masterbulk
 Tanker Pacific
 Neptune Orient Lines "NOL" (Temasek Holdings)
 Pacific International Lines "PIL"

South Korea
 EUKOR
 Hanjin Shipping (Hanjin Group) - BC, CS, RR, TK, CC 
 Hyundai Glovis
 Hyundai Merchant Marine "HMM" (Hyundai Group) -CC, BC, CS, RR, TK
 STX Pan Ocean

Malaysia
 MISC Berhad (PETRONAS)
 Malaysian Bulk Carriers

Pakistan
 Pakistan National Shipping Corporation "PNSC" (State-owned enterprise)

Saudi Arabia
 Bahri (company) "formerly NSCSA"

Taiwan
 Evergreen Marine (Evergreen Group)
 Wan Hai Lines
 Yang Ming Marine Transport (China Merchants Group)

Turkey
 Arkas Container Transport
 BMZ Group
 Cornships Management and Agency

Europe

Austria
 Austrian Lloyd Ship Management

Defunct
 Österreichischer Lloyd
 Austro-Americana

Belgium
 Compagnie Maritime Belge "CMB"
 Delphis
 Euro Marine Logistics
 Regie voor Maritiem Transport (State-owned enterprise)

Bulgaria
 Navibulgar

Croatia
 Atlantska Plovidba

Denmark
 Dampskibsselskabet Norden "D/S Norden"
 Dampskibsselskabet Torm "Torm"
 DFDS Tor Line (DFDS A/S)
 East Asiatic Company
 J. Lauritzen A/S
 Maersk Line (A. P. Moller-Maersk Group)
 Martin Bencher (Scandinavia) A/S

Estonia
 Estonian Shipping Company (ESCO)
 Hansa Shipping

Finland
 Finnlines (Grimaldi Group, Italy)
 SeaRail (Tallink, Estonia / VR Group, Finland / Green Cargo

France
 Compagnie Générale Maritime (CMA CGM)
 Delmas (CMA CGM)
 Louis Dreyfus Armateurs

Defunct
 Compagnie Générale Transatlantique
 Messageries Maritimes

Germany
 F. Laeisz
 Hamburg Süd (From 1 December 2017 under ownership of Maersk)
 Hapag-Lloyd
 H. Vogemann
 Deutsche Afrika-Linien 
 K Line European Sea Highway Services "KESS"
 Oldendorff Carriers

Defunct
 Norddeutscher Lloyd "NDL"
 Bernhard Schulte

Greece
 Atlas Maritime
 Ceres Hellenic Shipping Enterprises
 Lykiardopoulo

Defunct
 Epirotiki Lines

Iceland
 Eimskip

Italy
 Grimaldi Group
 Italia Marittima >Lloyd Triestino (Evergreen Group, Taiwan)
 Messina Line

Latvia
 Latvian Shipping Company (Latvijas kuģniecība)

Monaco
 Costamare

Netherlands
 Seatrade
 Dockwise (Boskalis, 2013)

Norway
 Aker American Shipping (Aker Group)
 Awilco LNG
 Belships
 Bergesen Worldwide (BW Group)
 Borgestad
 Camillo Eitzen & Co ASA (Eitzen Group)
 Christensen Canadian African Lines
 Color Group AS
 Det Stavangerske Dampskibsselskab "DSD"
 Norwegian Car Carriers AS "NOCC"
 Eitzen Chemical (Eitzen Group)
 Eitzen Maritime Services ASA (Eitzen Group)
 Farstad Shipping
 First Olsen Tankers
 Fred. Olsen & Co.
 GC Rieber Shipping
 Golar LNG
 Green Reefers
 Grieg Shipping
 Havila Shipping
 I. M. Skaugen
 J. J. Ugland
 J. Ludwig Mowinckels Rederi
 Knutsen O.A.S. Shipping AS
 Kristian Jebsens Rederi "Jebsens"
 Leif Höegh & Co
 Nor Lines
 Odfjell
 Siem Shipping
 Solvang
 Solstad Offshore
 Grieg Star Shipping
 Stolt-Nielsen
 United European Car Carriers
 Waterfront Shipping
 Westfal-Larsen
 Wallenius Wilhelmsen Logistics "WW" (Wallenius Lines AB, Sweden, and Wilh. Wilhelmsen Holding ASA, Norway)
 Wilh. Wilhelmsen Holding ASA "Wilhelmsen"
 Western Bulk
 Wilson ASA

Defunct
 A. F. Klaveness & Co
 Gerrards Rederi
 Norwegian America Line

Poland
 Polsteam > Polish Steamship Company >>Polska Zegluga Morska "PZM"

Portugal
 Portline

Romania
 Histria Shipmanagement

Russia
 Far East Shipping Company "FESCO"
 Sakhalin Shipping Company " SASCO"
 Sovcomflot "SCF" >Sovtorgflot
 Volgotanker

Defunct
 Baltic Sea Steamship Company

Spain
Defunct
 Compañía Transatlántica Española "Spanish Line"

Sweden
 Brostrom (from 2008 a part of A.P. Moller-Maersk)
 Johnson Line (Nordstjernan)
 Stena Sphere
 Wallenius Lines AB, (Soya Group)

Defunct
 DFDS Tor Line
 Rederi AB Slite
 Rederi AB Svea

Switzerland
 Mediterranean Shipping Company S.A. "MSC"

Ukraine
 UkrFerry

United Kingdom
 Bibby Line

Defunct
 African & Eastern Trade Corporation
 African Steamship Company
 Anchor Line
 Alfred Holt and Company "Blue Funnel Line"
 Blue Star Line
 Bristol City Line
 British India Steam Navigation Company "British India Line"
 Clan Line
 Douglas Steamship Company (Hong Kong)
 Elder Dempster Line
 Ellerman Line
 Evan Thomas Radcliffe
 Fyffes Line
 Harrison Line
 Hong Kong, Canton & Macao Steamboat Company (Hong Kong)
 Loch Line
 London & Overseas Freighters
 Manchester Liners
 New Zealand Shipping Company
 Olau Line
 Orient Steam Navigation Company "Orient Line"
 OT Africa Line (CMA CGM, France)
 Overseas Containers Limited
 Pacific Steam Navigation Company
 Palm Line
 Peninsular and Oriental Steam Navigation Company "P&O" (DP World, UAE)
 P&O Nedlloyd (Merged into A. P. Moller-Maersk Group)
 Port Line
 Red Star Line
 Royal Mail Lines
 Sea Containers "SEACO" (Headquarter in UK, and Bermuda)
 Shaw, Savill & Albion Line
 Silver Line
 Union-Castle Line
 United Africa Company

North America

Bermuda
 Frontline Ltd. (Hemen Holding, Norway) - TK
 Golden Ocean Group (Hemen Holding, Norway)

Canada
 Algoma Central
 Canada Steamship Lines
 CP Ships
 Fednav
 Groupe Desgagnés
 Upper Lakes Shipping Company

United States
 American Roll-on Roll-off Carrier
 Crowley Maritime
 Matson Navigation Company
 Pasha Hawaii
 Waterman Steamship Corporation

Oceania

Australia
 Australian National Line (CMA CGM, France)
 Toll Domestic Forwarding (Toll Group)

Fiji
 Patterson Brothers Shipping Company

Nauru
 Nauru Pacific Line

New Zealand
 New Zealand Shipping Company (P&O, UK)

Defunct
 Union Steam Ship Company of New Zealand

Samoa
 Pacific Forum Line

South America

Argentina
 Empresa Líneas Marítimas Argentinas "ELMA"

Brazil
 Wilson, Sons

Chile
 Compañía Sudamericana de Vapores "CSAV"

See also
 List of largest container shipping companies

References

Freight